Jo-Wilfried Tsonga defeated the defending champion David Nalbandian in the final, 6–3, 4–6, 6–4 to win the singles tennis title at the 2008 Paris Masters.

Seeds
All seeds receive a bye into the second round.

Draw

Finals

Top half

Section 1

Section 2

Bottom half

Section 3

Section 4

Qualifying

Qualifying seeds

Qualifiers

Lucky losers

Qualifying draw

First qualifier

Second qualifier

Third qualifier

Fourth qualifier

Fifth qualifier

Sixth qualifier

References

External links
Draw
Qualifying Draw
ITF tournament profile

Singles